The National Horticultural Society of France (French: Société nationale dhorticulture de France, or SNHF) is a horticultural society founded in 1827 by Louis-Étienne Héricart de Thury. Headquartered in Paris, it comprises specialized departments which organize conferences, themed journeys and garden visits, and exhibitions.

History 
The Société d’Horticulture de Paris was founded on 11 June 1827 on the initiative of Vicomte Héricart de Thury to unite enthusiasts who wanted to exchange ideas and cultivate exotic species. In 1835 the organization received royal recognition and became the Société Royale d’Horticulture. A second, similar organizations was formed, and was named Société Nationale d’Horticulture de la Seine.

Under the presidency of the Duc de Morny the two merged in 1854, taking the name Société Impériale Centrale d’Horticulture, with its headquarters on 84 Rue de Grenelle, in Paris's 7th arrondissement of Paris since 1860; the organization took the current name in 1885.

Library and holdings
The SNHF maintains a library and documentation center which in 2009 contained over 10,000 documents, including over 7,000 books (the oldest from 1541). In addition, it holds 1,102 periodicals and 2,492 horticultural catalogs. The SNHF also publishes a journal, Jardins de France.

Associated organizations
The SNHF unites more than 220 horticultural societies and associations from all over France.

External links

Online library catalog

Horticultural organizations
Gardening in France
Organizations based in Paris
Horticulture in France